The Shire of Lexton was a local government area about  northwest of Melbourne, the state capital of Victoria, Australia.

History

Lexton was incorporated as a road district on 17 February 1860, and became a shire on 30 June 1864. In January 1941, it annexed parts of the Shire of Avoca.

On 23 September 1994, the Shire of Lexton was abolished, and along with the Shire of Ripon and parts of the Shire of Avoca, was merged into the newly created Shire of Pyrenees.

Wards

The Shire of Lexton was divided into three ridings on 1 April 1988, each of which elected three councillors:
 North Riding
 South Riding
 West Riding

Towns and localities
 Amphitheatre
 Burnbank
 Evansford
 Glenbrae
 Glenlogie
 Glenpatrick
 Langi Kal Kal
 Lexton*
 Mount Lonarch
 Nowhere Creek
 Trawalla
 Waterloo
 Waubra

* Council seat.

Population

* Estimate in the 1958 Victorian Year Book.

References

External links
 Victorian Places - Lexton

Lexton